The Philippines national badminton team represents the Philippines in international badminton competitions. It is controlled by the Philippine Badminton Association. Nicknamed Smash Pilipinas, The Filipino team won bronze in the men's and women's team events at the Southeast Asian Games, in 1991 and 1981 respectfully.

History 
The national team was formed after the establishment of the Philippine Badminton Association in 1952. The Philippines made a couple of appearances at the Sudirman Cup in the 2010s.

Men's team 
The Philippines men's team first competed in the qualifiers for the 1984 Thomas Cup. The team were drawn with Hong Kong, Australia and Singapore and lost all of their matches in the group tie. Three years later, the Philippines competed in the 1987 Southeast Asian Games, where the team entered the semifinals for a guaranteed bronze medal but lost 0-3 to Malaysia. In 1992, the Philippines failed to qualify for the 1992 Thomas Cup after losing 1-4 to Pakistan, 0-5 to India and Singapore in the first stage of the qualifiers. In 1997, the Philippines lost the third place tie to Thailand at the Southeast Asian Games. In 1998, The Philippines tried to qualify for the 1998 Thomas Cup. The team shown improvement as they lost 1-4 to Singapore, 2-3 to Australia and won 5-0 against Iran.

The Philippines men's team made their Badminton Asia Team Championships debut in 2016. The team lost 0-5 to South Korea and 1-4 to Hong Kong and were eliminated in the group stages. They made their second appearance at the Asian Team Championships in 2018 and were eliminated in the group stages. The men's team made history when the team beat arch rival Singapore 3-2 to reach the quarterfinals in the 2020 edition of the championships. The team lost to Indonesia 0-3 in the quarter-finals.

Women's team 
The Philippines women's team debuted at the 1981 Southeast Asian Games and entered the semifinals to claim bronze. Ten years later, the women's team entered their second semifinal at the 1991 Southeast Asian Games and finished in fourth place. In 1992, the Philippines competed in the 1992 Uber Cup qualifiers. The team lost 0-5 to New Zealand and Hong Kong but won 5-0 against Tanzania to finish 3rd in the group. In 1998, the Philippines women's team failed to qualify again for the Uber Cup. Much like the men's team, the women's team lost 1-4 to Singapore and 2-3 to Australia but won 4-1 against Mauritius.

The women's team first debuted in the Badminton Asia Team Championships in 2018. They were eliminated in the group stages in 2018 and 2020.

Mixed team 
The Philippines have made several appearances in the Sudirman Cup, their first one being in 2009. They achieved 23rd place in the 2013 Sudirman Cup. and later 29th place in the 2015 Sudirman Cup. The mixed team competed in the 2017 Badminton Asia Mixed Team Championships but were halted in the group stages.

Competitive record

Thomas Cup

1964–2010 – Did not qualify

Uber Cup

1966–2010 – Did not qualify

Sudirman Cup

Asian Team Championships

Men's team

Women's team

Mixed team

Southeast Asian Games

Men's team

Women's team

Junior competitive record

Suhandinata Cup

Asian Junior Team Championships

Staff 
The following list shows the coaching staff for the Philippines national badminton team.

Players

Current squad

Men's team

Women's team

References

Badminton
National badminton teams
Badminton in the Philippines